Freelance is an upcoming American action comedy film directed by Pierre Morel and written by Jacob Lentz in his feature writing debut. It stars John Cena, Alison Brie, Juan Pablo Raba, Alice Eve, Marton Csokas, and Christian Slater.

Premise
Years after retiring from the Army, a Special Forces operator takes a job providing security for a female journalist as she interviews a cruel dictator. When a military coup breaks out in the middle of the interview, the three are forced to escape into the jungle together.

Cast
 John Cena as the retired special forces operator
 Alison Brie as the journalist
 Juan Pablo Raba as president Venegas
 Alice Eve
 Marton Csokas
 Christian Slater

Production
Freelance is the feature writing debut of television screenwriter Jacob Lentz. The film was announced on October 22, 2021, with Pierre Morel directing and John Cena attached to star. The film was reported to have a budget of at least $40 million. In January 2022, Alison Brie, Juan Pablo Raba, Alice Eve, Marton Csokas, and Christian Slater joined the cast. Filming began in Colombia on January 17, 2022, with cinematographer Thierry Arbogast.

References

External links
 

American action comedy films
Films about dictators
Films about journalists
Films about special forces
Films directed by Pierre Morel
Films set in jungles
Films shot in Colombia
Upcoming English-language films